In human population genetics, Y-Chromosome haplogroups define the major lineages of direct paternal (male) lines back to a shared common ancestor in Africa. Men in the same haplogroup share a set of differences, or markers, on their Y-Chromosome, which distinguish them from men in other haplogroups. These UEPs, or markers used to define haplogroups, are SNP mutations. Y-Chromosome Haplogroups all form "family trees" or "phylogenies", with both branches or sub-clades diverging from a common haplogroup ancestor, and also with all haplogroups themselves linked into one family tree which traces back ultimately to the most recent shared male line ancestor of all men alive today, called in popular science Y Chromosome Adam.

History

Creation of the Y-Chromosome Consortium
In the 1980s and 1990s, individual academic research groups each had their own nomenclature for naming Y-Chromosome haplogroups. This created an increasingly unmanageable communication barrier. In 2002, the Y-Chromosome Consortium (YCC) published a widely used proposal to standardize the naming of all Y-Chromosome haplogroups. This effort was based on comprehensive retesting of DNA samples .

The Y-Chromosome Consortium for many years left individual groups to maintain this standard. In 2008, they again published a comprehensive review of tree changes and retested samples. With this work, they strengthened their recommendation to move to a nomenclature system they referred to as shorthand .

Creation of the International Society of Genetic Genealogy (ISOGG) Tree Committee
In 2006, a group of citizen scientists with an interest in genetic genealogy formed a working group to document both their own discoveries and those in published research. They created a web based tree that attempted to be timely and had annual benchmark versions.

Conversion Table
The table below brings together all of these works at the point of the landmark 2002 YCC Tree. This allows a researcher reviewing older published literature to quickly move between nomenclatures.

Original Research Publications
The following research teams per their publications were represented in the creation of the YCC Tree.

See also

Genetics

Y-DNA Haplogroups and Subclades

Y-DNA Backbone Tree

References

Journals

ISOGG

 
 
 2007
 2008
 2009
 2010
 2011
 2011
 2012
 2013
 2014